Shahin Soltan oghlu Baghirov (born January 12, 1965) is an Azerbaijani statesman who serves as the chairman of the State Customs Committee of Azerbaijan Republic since 2023. Baghirov previously served as the First Deputy Chairman of the State Customs Committee of Azerbaijan Republic from 2022 to 2023. He holds the rank of Lieutenant General of the Customs Service.

Biography 
Shahin Baghirov was born on January 12, 1965, in Baku. In 1986, he graduated from the Faculty of Economics of Voronezh State University, and in 2003, as a second education, he graduated from the Faculty of Customs Work Organization of the Russian Customs Academy. In 2004, he graduated from the post-graduate studies of the same academy and received the scientific degree of Candidate of Economic Sciences (PhD in economics).

Shahin Baghirov started working in the system of the Azerbaijan agro-industrial complex on the basis of appointment. Since 1992, he has worked as an inspector in the customs system, inspector of the Baku General Customs Department, head of the "Ali-Bayramli" customs post, worked in the Main Organizational Department of Customs Control, the Internal Security Department, the deputy head, and then the head of the Organizational General Department of Customs Control. 

Shahin Baghirov was the Deputy Chairman of the State Customs Committee of the Republic of Azerbaijan from January 16, 2014 to July 6, 2018. In 2019–2022, he worked in the State Service on Property Issues under the Ministry of Economy of the Republic of Azerbaijan. On July 18, 2022, by the Decree of the President of the Republic of Azerbaijan, he was appointed the first deputy chairman of the State Customs Committee, and at the same time, was appointed as an acting chairman. He was appointed the chairman of the committee on February 14, 2023.

Shahin Baghirov worked as the deputy chairman of the working group of the United Nations Economic Commission for Europe on customs issues related to transport, the chairman of the Administrative Committee of the United Nations Customs Convention on the International Transport of Goods, as well as the chairman of the Administrative Committee of the International Convention on the Harmonization of Frontier Controls of Goods (1982).

On January 28, 2005, he was given the special supreme rank of Major General of Customs Service, and on February 3, 2014, Lieutenant General of Customs Service.

Honours 
 For service to the Fatherland Order (2nd degree) — January 30, 2016
 For service to the Fatherland Order (3rd degree) — January 24, 2012
 Medal "For Distinction in Civil Service" — January 26, 2010

References 

1965 births
Living people
Politicians from Baku
Voronezh State University alumni